Entre Mar y Palmeras is the second live album of the Dominican artist Juan Luis Guerra and 4:40. It was released on June 18, 2022 along with special concert, an open-air and audience-free concert, broadcast by HBO special, premiere on June 3, 2021, performing the songs and was recorded at the Esmeralda Beach, Miches in the Dominican Republic. It contains 16 live versions of hits and was directed by Guerra's oldest son, Jean Guerra. The album won Best Long Form Music Video at the 22nd Annual Latin Grammy Awards and Best Merengue/Bachata Album at the 23rd Annual Latin Grammy Awards. Also, it was nominated for Album of the year at the 2022 Lo Nuestro Awards.

The album was supported by the released of three official singles, Rosalia (Live!), Farolito (Live) and Vale La Pena (Live). A billboard at New York`s Time Square and series of performances at awards show such as Latin Grammy awards and 2021`s Soberano Awards. Subsequently, Guerra embarked in at the Entre Mar y Palmeras Tour in 2022.

Tracklist

References 

Juan Luis Guerra live albums
2021 live albums